RasenBallsport Leipzig e.V., commonly known as RB Leipzig, is a professional association football club based in Leipzig, Saxony, Germany. They play their home matches at the Red Bull Arena. The club was founded in 2009 by initiative of the company Red Bull GmbH, who purchased the playing rights of a fifth division side SSV Markranstädt, with the intention of advancing the new club to the top-flight Bundesliga within eight years. Men's professional football is run by the spin-off organization RasenballSport Leipzig GmbH.

As of the end of 2021–22, the club's first team has spent six seasons in the first tier of German football, two in the second, one in the third, three in the fourth and one in the fifth. The table details their achievements in first-team competitions, and records their top goalscorer and average home league attendance, for each completed season since their first appearance in the NOFV-Oberliga Süd in 2009–10.

Key
Key to competitions

 Bundesliga (1. BL) – The top-flight of football in Germany, established in 1963.
 2. Bundesliga (2. BL) – The second division of football in Germany, established in 1974.
 3. Liga (3. L) – The third division of football in Germany, established in 2008.
 Regionalliga (RL) – The fourth division of football in Germany, established in 1964 and designated as the fourth tier in 2008.
 NOFV-Oberliga (NOFV) – A fifth division of football in Germany, established in 1991.
 DFB-Pokal (DFBP) – The premier knockout cup competition in German football, first contested in 1935.
 UEFA Champions League (UCL) – The premier competition in European football since 1955. It went by the name of European Cup until 1992.
 UEFA Europa League (UEL) – The second-tier competition in European football since 1971. It went by the name of UEFA Cup until 2009.

Key to colors and symbols

Key to league record
 Season = The year and article of the season
 Div = Division/level on pyramid
 League = League name
 Pld = Matches played
 W = Matches won
 D = Matches drawn
 L = Matches lost
 GF = Goals for
 GA = Goals against
 GD = Goal difference
 Pts = Points
 Pos. = League position

Key to cup record
 DNE = Did not enter
 DNQ = Did not qualify
 NH = Competition not held or cancelled
 QR = Qualifying round
 PR = Preliminary round
 GS = Group stage
 R1 = First round
 R2 = Second round
 R3 = Third round
 R4 = Fourth round
 R5 = Fifth round
 Ro16 = Round of 16
 QF = Quarter-finals
 SF = Semi-finals
 F = Final
 RU = Runners-up
 W = Winners

Seasons

1. Avg. attendance include statistics from league matches only.
2. Top goalscorer(s) includes all goals scored in League, DFB-Pokal, UEFA Champions League, UEFA Europa League, and other competitive matches.

References

Seasons
 
RB Leipzig
RB Leipzig